The American Heritage Museum is a military history museum located on the grounds of the Collings Foundation in the town of Stow, Massachusetts,  west of Boston. The collection consists of over 100 artifacts, most of which were formerly part of the Military Vehicle Technology Foundation collection in Portola Valley, California. Over half of the items on display are from the World War II era, with World War I, the Korean War, Vietnam War, Gulf War, Iraq War, and the War on Terror are also represented. Most of the items on display are American, German, Russian, or British in origin.

History

Beginning in the early 1980s and continuing for the next 20 years, Jacques Littlefield, a Stanford University graduate and former Hewlett Packard engineer, amassed a $30 million collection of military vehicles and engaged in a program of restoring many of them and giving educational tours to the public. By the time of Littlefield's premature death in 2009, his collection had expanded to over 240 vehicles. In accordance with his objective of preserving the collection for the future, the Foundation donated its collection to the Collings Foundation, a non-profit educational institution founded in 1979 with a mission dedicated to the preservation and public display of transportation-related history. The Collings Foundation then auctioned off 120 of the vehicles, netting $9.5 million to fund creation of a new  museum to display the remaining 80 items in the collection at the Collings Foundation headquarters in the Boston area. 

Meanwhile, in August 2015, the Planning Board of the Town of Stow initially rejected the Foundation's application to build the museum, questioning the propriety of locating such a large facility on land that was zoned for residential use. In its defense, the Foundation cited Massachusetts' Dover Amendment, which the Foundation believed would exempt the museum from zoning restrictions, on the grounds that its purpose would be primarily educational in nature. Ultimately, an agreement was reached between the two parties in July 2017, and construction of the museum was completed in 2018. The museum held a preview opening in October 2018 and had its grand opening in May 2019.

Exhibits

Visitors are encouraged to begin their tour with the viewing of a brief introductory film, followed by the immersive walk-through of the "WWI Trench Experience" room containing a recreation of Western Front trenches at the Battle of Saint-Mihiel, the first and only offensive launched solely by the United States Army in World War I. Visitors next enter the "War Clouds" room, which covers the Interwar period and the rise of Nazi Germany. They then exit to the main cavernous display room of the museum, in which artifacts are arranged roughly chronologically and grouped under major campaigns and theaters of war.

Some of the major artifacts currently on display are as follows:

The museum also includes a section of the Berlin Wall, and a September 11 memorial featuring a twisted steel beam from one of the World Trade Center towers. The steel beam was dedicated in a ceremony at the museum on September 11, 2018.

See also
Tank museums
The Tank Museum – England
Imperial War Museum – England
Kubinka Tank Museum – Russia
Musée des Blindés – France
Military museum Lešany – Czech Republic
Deutsches Panzermuseum – Germany
Yad La-Shiryon – Latrun, Israel
Parola Tank Museum – Finland
Australian Armour and Artillery Museum – Australia
Nationaal Militair Museum – Soesterberg, The Netherlands
Royal Tank Museum – Amman, Jordan
Base Borden Military Museum - Canada

American military museums
The International Museum of World War II – Natick, Massachusetts (closed)
National Museum of the Pacific War – Fredericksburg, Texas
National World War I Museum and Memorial – Kansas City, Missouri
The National WWII Museum – New Orleans, Louisiana
National Museum of the Marine Corps - Triangle, Virginia
Heartland Museum of Military Vehicles – Lexington, Nebraska

Other resources
Lists of armoured fighting vehicles
List of military vehicles of World War II
Tank classification

References

Further reading

External links 
 Official website
 www.collingsfoundation.org/american-heritage-museum
 Opening Ceremony for the American Heritage Museum - May 2, 2019
 PHOTOS: American Heritage Museum opens in Hudson
 American Heritage Museum Opens - May 2nd, 2019

Tank museums
World War I museums in the United States
World War II museums in the United States
Korean War museums
Vietnam War museums
Cold War museums in the United States
Military and war museums in the United States
Military and war museums in Massachusetts
Museums in Middlesex County, Massachusetts
Museums established in 2019
2019 establishments in Massachusetts
History museums in Massachusetts
Educational foundations in the United States
Non-profit organizations based in Massachusetts